Paul McCann was an Australian professional rugby league footballer who played one season in the New South Wales Rugby Football League (NSWRFL) in the 1930s.

Playing career 
Prior to playing for South Sydney, McCann captained West Wyalong.

McCann made his rugby league debut with South Sydney in April 25, 1938, in Round 2 against Eastern Suburbs. The following round, he recorded his first career try in a 31-5 win over North Sydney. In Round 5, McCann scored in a win over St. George.

This time playing as a centre, he scored in his final game of his career in the last round of 1938 against Newtown. McCann concluded his career with 9 tries from 10 appearances.

References 

Australian rugby league players
South Sydney Rabbitohs players
Rugby league five-eighths